The Statesboro STEAM Academy is a public charter school located in Statesboro, Georgia, United States, and operated by the CCAT Public School District. It was authorized by the Georgia State Board of Education and opened its doors in September 2002. Prior to 2016, it was known as the Charter Conservatory for Liberal Arts and Technology.

Academics

CCAT's Learning Perspective uses Howard Gardner's theory of multiple intelligences. Instead of textbooks, CCAT uses computers for much of its schoolwork and relies on the knowledge of its teachers to meet student needs. Statesboro STEAM will be relocating as found out 2019.

School structure 
As of 2022, the current grades taught range from grade 5 to grade 12. Corliss Reese is the principal of the school.

Sports 
Statesboro STEAM has a variety of sports teams, including men and women's basketball and cross country. STEAM also has an Esports team, playing Super Smash Bros. Ultimate and Rocket League.

References

External links

Charter schools in Georgia (U.S. state)
Schools in Bulloch County, Georgia
Public high schools in Georgia (U.S. state)
Public middle schools in Georgia (U.S. state)
2002 establishments in Georgia (U.S. state)